Malcolm MacDonald (September 16, 1865 – September 6, 1921) was an American tennis player. He competed in the men's singles and doubles events at the 1904 Summer Olympics.

References

1865 births
1921 deaths
American male tennis players
Olympic tennis players of the United States
Tennis players at the 1904 Summer Olympics
Place of birth missing